Alashkert is a village in the Armavir Province of Armenia.

Toponymy 
Prior to 1935 the village was known as Kyarimarkh. The village was then known as Sovetakan between 1935 and 2008. In 2008, the village was renamed Alashkert, after the historic Western Armenian town of Alashkert, from which many of its inhabitants had escaped in 1918.

History 
The village was populated by Iranian Azerbaijanis who were forcibly settled in Alashkert as part of raising Muslim dominance in the region. Armenian migrants settled in the region in 1918  after having escaped from Western Armenia.

References

External links 

Populated places in Armavir Province